George Edward Turley (1931–2010), was an English international lawn and indoor bowler and Middlesbrough footballer.

Bowls career

World Championships
Turley's finest moment came when he won the Fours gold medal at the 1984 World Outdoor Bowls Championship in Aberdeen with Tony Allcock, John Bell and Julian Haines.

Commonwealth Games
He represented England in the fours, at the 1982 Commonwealth Games in Brisbane, Queensland, Australia.

National
He was the pairs champion with Mal Hughes at the 1983 National Championships bowling for Eldon Grove BC of Durham.

Turley made his England international bowls debut indoors in 1974 and outdoors in 1980.

Football career
Turley played professional football for Middlesbrough from 1949 until 1951.

References

1931 births
2010 deaths
English male bowls players
English footballers
Middlesbrough F.C. players
English Football League players
Bowls World Champions
Association footballers not categorized by position
Bowls players at the 1982 Commonwealth Games
Commonwealth Games competitors for England